Koba may refer to:

Places
Koba, Burkina Faso
Koba, Indonesia, a town in Bangka-Belitung, Indonesia
Koba, Faranah, Guinea
Koba, Kindia, Guinea
Koba Island, one of the Aru Islands of Indonesia
Gupo Island, an island in Penghu County, Taiwan
Fitzroy Island (Queensland), originally Koba, an island off the coast of Far North Queensland, Australia
Niokolo-Koba National Park, a World Heritage Site and natural protected area in south eastern Senegal near the Guinea-Bissau border
Niokolo-Koba Airport
Kapitaï and Koba, two areas on the coast of West Africa which were the object of German colonial initiatives in 1884 and 1885. They lay between the Pongo and Dubréka rivers, south of Senegal and Gambia in modern Guinea

People
Koba, a nickname used by Joseph Stalin
Koba (given name)
Koba (surname), a Japanese surname

Fictional figures
Koba, a character from the 1883 novel The Patricide by Alexander Kazbegi
Koba, a character from the 2011 film Warrior
Koba, a fictional bonobo and the main antagonist of the Planet of the Apes reboot series

Arts
Koba Entertainment
Koba (play), a play by Raymond Williams, based on Stalin's life
Koba the Dread, a 2002 non-fiction book by Martin Amis
Koba LaD, real name Marcel Junior Loutarila, French rapper

Others
Koba language, a language of Indonesia
Koba (sweet), a confectionery sweet
Kutama Old Boys Association, Zimbabwe
Koba, a plant that is indigenous to Ethiopia